Lukas Prokop (born 26 April 1999) is an Austrian professional footballer who plays as a left-back for DSV Leoben.

Career
Prokop began his footballing career with Austria Wien, progressing through all youth levels of the club. Ahead of the 2016–17 season, he was promoted to the reserve team. In October 2017, he made his debut in Austrian Regionalliga when he was in the starting lineup on the 15th matchday of the 2017–18 season against Karabakh Wien. At the end of the season he won promotion 2. Liga with Austria Wien II.

He made his debut in the second division in July 2018, when he came off the bench for Stefan Sulzer in the 55th minute of the first matchday of the 2018–19 season against Kapfenberger SV. In three second division seasons with the team he made 75 appearances, in which he scored one goal.

On 28 May 2021, Prokop joined Austrian Football Bundesliga club Rheindorf Altach on a two-year contract.

On 15 December 2022, Prokop signed with DSV Leoben, with contract beginning in January 2023.

Personal life
Prokop's older brother, Dominik Prokop, is also a professional footballer who plays for SV Wehen Wiesbaden.

References

1999 births
Footballers from Vienna
Living people
Austrian footballers
Association football defenders
FK Austria Wien players
SC Rheindorf Altach players
DSV Leoben players
Austrian Football Bundesliga players
2. Liga (Austria) players
Austrian Regionalliga players